Pachyrhynchus reticulatus is a species weevil in the family Curculionidae. This species can be found in Philippines, Luzon, Marinduque.

References 

 Encyclopaedia of Life
 G. R. Waterhouse   Descriptions of the Species of the Curculionideous Genus Pachyrhynchus
  Transactions of the Royal Entomological Society of London
 Online Resource on Philippine Beetles

Brentidae
Beetles described in 1841
Insects of the Philippines